Deividas Taurosevičius (born August 28, 1977) is a Lithuanian retired mixed martial artist who last competed in the Featherweight division. A professional competitor from 2002 until 2013, he competed for the WEC, Bellator, the Cage Fury Fighting Championships, and for the New York Pitbulls of the IFL.

Background
Originally from Lithuania, Taurosevicius was a talented rugby player, competing for the national team, and winning an award given to the best player in the country in 1999. He then moved to the United States with the desire of continuing his professional career, but was not content with playing in America as he felt the sport did not have enough respect in the country. In 2002, Taurosevicius turned professional with his MMA career.

Mixed martial arts career

Early career
Taurosevičius started his professional MMA career in 2002, primarily competing on cards in Massachusetts and New Jersey. In early 2007, he began fighting for the New York Pitbulls in the International Fight League.

Taurosevicius went 2–1 with the promotion, his lone loss being at the hands of Ryan Schultz in his last appearance, which was for the promotion's Lightweight Championship.

World Extreme Cagefighting
In September 2008, he signed with Affliction  and was scheduled to face Mark Hominick on the Affliction: Trilogy undercard on August 1, 2009.  The match was subsequently picked up by Zuffa and was scheduled to take place at WEC 43. However, Hominick was replaced by Javier Vazquez. Taurosevicius won by split decision.

Taurosevičius defeated previously unbeaten Mackens Semerzier via unanimous decision at WEC 46.

Taurosevičius lost via majority decision to LC Davis on March 6, 2010 at WEC 47.

Bellator
Taurosevicius then competed for Bellator at Bellator 33 against Wilson Reis and was defeated via split decision. He has most recently competed for the Ring of Combat promotion based out of New Jersey, winning the promotion's Featherweight Championship and successfully defending his title three times.

Personal life
Taurosevicius is married.

Mixed martial arts record

|-
|Win
|align=center|17–5
| Guillermo Serment
|Submission (rear-naked choke)
|Ring of Combat 44
|
|align=center|2
|align=center|2:20
|Atlantic City, New Jersey, United States
|
|-
|Win
|align=center|16–5
| Frank Caraballo
|Submission (reverse triangle choke)
|Ring of Combat 43
|
|align=center|1
|align=center|3:38
|Atlantic City, New Jersey, United States
|
|-
|Win
|align=center|15–5
| Mike Santiago
|Submission (armbar)
|Ring of Combat 42
|
|align=center|2
|align=center|3:50
|Atlantic City, New Jersey, United States
|
|-
|Win
|align=center|14–5
| Marlon Moraes
|Submission (arm-triangle choke)
|Ring of Combat 38
|
|align=center|1
|align=center|2:34
|Atlantic City, New Jersey, United States
|
|-
|Win
|align=center|13–5
| Ronnie Rogers
|Submission (rear-naked choke)
|Ring of Combat 37
|
|align=center|2
|align=center|2:24
|Atlantic City, New Jersey, United States
|  
|-
|Loss
|align=center|12–5
| Wilson Reis
|Decision (split)
|Bellator 33
|
|align=center|3
|align=center|5:00
|Philadelphia, Pennsylvania, United States
|
|-
|Loss
|align=center|12–4
| LC Davis
|Decision (majority)
|WEC 47
|
|align=center|3
|align=center|5:00
|Columbus, Ohio, United States
|
|-
|Win
|align=center|12–3
| Mackens Semerzier
|Decision (unanimous)
|WEC 46
|
|align=center|3
|align=center|5:00
|Sacramento, California, United States
|
|-
|Win
|align=center|11–3
| Javier Vazquez
|Decision (split)
|WEC 43
|
|align=center|3
|align=center|5:00
|San Antonio, Texas, United States
|
|-
|Loss
|align=center|10–3
| Ryan Schultz
|Decision (unanimous)
|IFL 2007 Team Championship
|
|align=center|5
|align=center|4:00
|Uncasville, Connecticut, United States
|For IFL Lightweight Championship.
|-
|Win
|align=center|10–2
| Bart Palaszewski
|Technical Submission (armbar)
|IFL 2007 Team Championship
|
|align=center|2
|align=center|1:30
|Hollywood, Florida, United States
|
|-
|Win
|align=center|9–2
| Savant Young
|Decision (unanimous)
|IFL: 2007 Semifinals
|
|align=center|3
|align=center|4:00
|East Rutherford, New Jersey, United States
|
|-
| Win
|align=center|8–2
| Kevin Roddy
|Submission (armbar)
|CFFC 5: Two Worlds, One Cage
|
|align=center|1
|align=center|4:49
|Atlantic City, New Jersey, United States
|
|-
|Win
|align=center|7–2
| Zac George
|Submission (arm-triangle choke)
|IFL: Connecticut
|
|align=center|1
|align=center|3:12
|Uncasville, Connecticut, United States
|
|-
| Win
|align=center|6–2
| Dan Lauzon
|Submission (rear-naked choke)
|CFFC3: Battleground
|
|align=center|2
|align=center|1:15
|Atlantic City, New Jersey, United States
|
|-
|Win
|align=center|5–2
| Anthony Morrison
|Submission (triangle choke)
|CFFC2: Cage Fury Fighting Championships 2
|
|align=center|1
|align=center|2:09
|Atlantic City, New Jersey, United States
|
|-
|Loss
|align=center|4–2
| Frankie Edgar
|Decision (unanimous)
|RF 13: Battle at the Beach
|
|align=center|3
|align=center|5:00
|Wildwood, New Jersey, United States
|
|-
|Win
|align=center|4–1
| Jerome Isip
|Technical Submission (guillotine choke)
|RF 11: Reality Fighting 11
|
|align=center|1
|align=center|N/A
|Atlantic City, New Jersey, United States
|
|-
|Win
|align=center|3–1
| Tony Barber
|Submission (rear-naked choke)
|MD22: Mass Destruction 22
|
|align=center|1
|align=center|3:01
|Fall River, Massachusetts, United States
|
|-
|Win
|align=center|2–1
| James Jones
|Decision (unanimous)
|RF9: Reality Fighting 9
|
|align=center|2
|align=center|5:00
|Wildwood, New Jersey, United States
|
|-
|Win
|align=center|1–1
| Austin Philbin
|Submission (guillotine choke)
|ECFA: Colosseum
|
|align=center|1
|align=center|N/A
|Truro, Massachusetts, United States
|
|-
|Loss
|align=center|0–1
| Mike Acosta
|Decision
|SF 1: Bragging Rights
|
|align=center|2
|align=center|5:00
|Bayonne, New Jersey, United States
|

References

External links

1977 births
Living people
Lithuanian male mixed martial artists
Featherweight mixed martial artists
Mixed martial artists utilizing Brazilian jiu-jitsu
Lithuanian practitioners of Brazilian jiu-jitsu
People awarded a black belt in Brazilian jiu-jitsu
Lithuanian expatriate sportspeople in the United States
People from Copiague, New York